The Engine House No. 1 in Sandusky, Ohio was built in 1915.  It was listed on the National Register of Historic Places in 1982.

It is a two-and-a-half-story limestone building.  It has two square towers, at its northeast and southeast corners.

It is Greco-Egyptian-Functional in style.

See also 
 National Register of Historic Places listings in Erie County, Ohio
 Engine House No. 3 (Sandusky, Ohio)
 No. 5 Fire Station (Sandusky, Ohio)

References

Fire stations on the National Register of Historic Places in Ohio
National Register of Historic Places in Erie County, Ohio
Egyptian Revival architecture in the United States
Fire stations completed in 1915
1915 establishments in Ohio
Buildings and structures in Sandusky, Ohio